Robert Romawia Royte is an Indian politician from Aizawl, Mizoram. He has been elected to the Mizoram Legislative Assembly 2018 from Aizawl East - II Constituency, and is currently Minister of State in the MNF ministry and holds the portfolios of Sports and Youth Services, Tourism and Information and Communication Technology.

Personal
Robert Romawia is the son of  Than Thuama Royte and Lalbiakveli and was born on January 29, 1967. He is married to Lalrampari Hnamte, a high school teacher and has 4 children.

Education
He has completed his M.A. and M.Phil in Political Science in NEHU, Shillong.

Career
He is currently the Minister of State for three departments Sports and Youth Services, Tourism and Information and Communication Technology. He is the founder of TT ROYTE Group and was the proprietor & chief managing director of Northeast Consultancy Services in Aizawl before his career shifted to politics. He is also the owner of I-League champion club Aizawl FC.

Awards and Achievements
 Appreciation Certificate for outstanding achievement by Govt. of  Nagaland & Nagaland Education Mission Society, 2010.
 “Zothansiamtu Award” All Mizoram Educated Federation Award, 2010. 
 Mizo of the Year, 2012, by Lelte Weekly Magazine.
 A good number of Appreciation Certificates from Young Mizo Association, Mizoram Upa Pawl (Mizoram Old Aged Association), Mizo Zirlai Pawl(MZP), Mizo Students Union (MSU) and other NGOs.
 Award for Most Successful Person in Mizoram, 2013 by Mizoram Periodical Journalist Association, Gen. Hqrs. Aizawl.
 Known as “Most Doner” and Philanthropist in Mizoram for the cause of humanities and welfare of the poor and society at large.
 Editor's Award for Excellence by Sports Illustrated Magazine 2018.
 Achiever's Award by Pratidin Time group 2017.
 National Nagri Award 2019.
 Northeast Man of the Year 2017 by Byatikram Group and Telegraph.

References

1967 births
Mizoram politicians
National Democratic Alliance candidates in the 2014 Indian general election
People from Aizawl
Living people
Mizo National Front politicians
Association football executives
Indian football chairmen and investors
Mizo people
North-Eastern Hill University alumni
Mizoram MLAs 2018–2023